...à la campagne is a French film directed by Manuel Poirier, released 5 April 1995.

Starring 
 Benoît Régent : Benoît
 Judith Henry : Lila
 Sergi López : Pablo
  : Gaston
 Serge Riaboukine : Emile
  : Mylène
 Laure Duthilleul : Françoise
  : Cathy
 Céline Poirier : Céline
 Philippe Duquesne
 Olivier Broche

References

External links 
 
 ...à la campagne at the site of Diaphana, the distributor of the film

French romantic comedy-drama films
1995 films
1990s French-language films
Films directed by Manuel Poirier
1990s French films